

The Schneider ES-60 Boomerang is a single-seat glider that was designed and manufactured in Australia in the 1960s. It is constructed of wood and fabric.  It was designed and manufactured by Edmund Schneider Pty of Adelaide, South Australia. It has a fixed main wheel and a tail skid. The Boomerang has an all-moving, swept tailplane that resembles a boomerang and hence the name given to the ES-60.  A version with a conventional straight stabiliser and moving elevator was also manufactured, called the ES-60B Super Arrow.

In the 1950s Edmund Schneider Pty Ltd manufactured a number of Schleicher Ka 6 gliders, under licence from Alexander Schleicher of Germany.  However, the Ka 6 with its low wing loading proved to be unsuited as a competition glider in Australia's strong summer thermal conditions. The Gliding Federation of Australia asked Edmund Schneider to design and manufacture a competition sailplane better suited to Australian conditions. The result was the ES-60 Boomerang.

Specifications

See also

Notes

References
Sailplane Directory. Schneider. Online. October 7, 2007.
 
 ES-60 Boomerang in Sailplane Directory

1960s Australian sailplanes
Glider aircraft
Edmund Schneider aircraft